Orewa is a suburb of Auckland, New Zealand’s largest city. It lies on the Hibiscus Coast, just north of the base of the Whangaparāoa Peninsula and 40 kilometres north of central Auckland. It is a popular holiday destination.

The Northern Motorway, part of State Highway 1, passes just inland of Orewa and extends through the twin Johnston Hill tunnels to near Puhoi. Orewa was administered as part of the Rodney District for two decades, until this was subsumed into the new Auckland Council in October 2010.

History

In the late 19th and early 20th centuries, Orewa and the Weiti River (then known as the Wade River) were a major locations for the kauri gum digging trade.

Demographics

Orewa had a population of 10,242 at the 2018 New Zealand census, an increase of 1,653 people (19.2%) since the 2013 census, and an increase of 2,871 people (38.9%) since the 2006 census. There were 4,389 households, comprising 4,599 males and 5,643 females, giving a sex ratio of 0.81 males per female, with 1,287 people (12.6%) aged under 15 years, 1,170 (11.4%) aged 15 to 29, 3,720 (36.3%) aged 30 to 64, and 4,062 (39.7%) aged 65 or older.

Ethnicities were 86.1% European/Pākehā, 6.1% Māori, 2.7% Pacific peoples, 11.0% Asian, and 1.9% other ethnicities. People may identify with more than one ethnicity.

The percentage of people born overseas was 35.8, compared with 27.1% nationally.

Although some people chose not to answer the census's question about religious affiliation, 42.2% had no religion, 47.6% were Christian, 0.1% had Māori religious beliefs, 1.5% were Hindu, 0.5% were Muslim, 0.8% were Buddhist and 1.3% had other religions.

Of those at least 15 years old, 1,707 (19.1%) people had a bachelor's or higher degree, and 1,683 (18.8%) people had no formal qualifications. 1,530 people (17.1%) earned over $70,000 compared to 17.2% nationally. The employment status of those at least 15 was that 3,210 (35.8%) people were employed full-time, 1,107 (12.4%) were part-time, and 165 (1.8%) were unemployed.

Education
Orewa District High School was founded in 1956. In 1974, the school was split into Orewa School and Orewa College. Orewa North School was founded in 1978, and another primary school opened at Red Beach to the south in 1988.

Orewa College is a secondary (years 7-13) school with a roll of  students.

Orewa School and Orewa North School are contributing primary (years 1-6) schools, with rolls of  students and  students respectively.

All three schools are coeducational. Rolls are as of

Gallery

Orewa Speech

Orewa made political headlines on 27 January 2004, when New Zealand National Party leader Don Brash, then the leader of the opposition in Parliament, gave what became known as the Orewa speech in front of the local Rotary club on a theme of race relations in New Zealand and, in particular, the special status of Māori. He advocated 'one rule for all'.

References

External links
 Hibiscus Coast Community House

Populated places in the Auckland Region
Beaches of the Auckland Region
Hibiscus Coast